Kheyt may refer to:
 Kheyt, Mosharrahat
 Kheyt-e Amareh
 Kheyt-e Zobeyd